Rachel Herbert (born 1935) is a British actress whose television appearances include roles in Deadline Midnight (1960), Thursday Theatre (1964), The Villains (1964), No Hiding Place (1963–65), Danger Man (1965), The Power Game (1965–66), and Thirty-Minute Theatre (1967). She appeared in The Prisoner episode entitled "Free for All" (1967) as Number Fifty-Eight but ultimately revealed to be the new  Number Two.

Other roles include ITV Play of the Week (1965–67), Man in a Suitcase (1968), Spindoe (1968), The Champions (1969), Callan (1970), Special Branch (1970), ITV Saturday Night Theatre (1971); episode 1 of Lord Peter Wimsey 's Clouds of Witness, Murder Must Advertise (1973), The Pallisers (1974), The Venturers (1975), Softly, Softly: Taskforce (1974–75), Shadows (1978), The Professionals (1978), Prince Regent (1979), The Enigma Files (1980), Minder (1980), Crown Court (1973–84), Screen Two (1986), and The House of Eliott (1994).

Herbert's film appearances include Robbery (1967), The Raging Moon (1971) and The Doctor and the Devils (1985).

References

External links

Herbert on the Danger Man website
Herbert on The Prisoner Online website

1935 births
Living people
English television actresses
English film actresses